Halfway Creek is a  long 2nd order tributary to the Hyco River in Halifax County, Virginia.

Course
Halfway Creek rises in Cluster Springs, Virginia, and then flows generally east-southeast to join the Hyco River about 2.5 miles southeast of Cluster Springs.

Watershed
Halfway Creek drains  of area, receives about 45.8 in/year of precipitation, has a wetness index of 388.13, and is about 59% forested.

See also
List of rivers of Virginia

References

Rivers of Virginia
Rivers of Halifax County, Virginia
Tributaries of the Roanoke River